Television Screen Magazine, also known as TV Screen Magazine, is an NBC Television Network series which debuted 17 November 1946, airing Sundays at 8:30 p.m. ET, and ended on July 23, 1949.

Participants 
Hosts and panelists included Bob Haymes, John McCaffery, Millicent Fenwick, Ray Forrest, Alan Scott, and George F. Putnam. The series later moved to Saturdays at 8:30pm ET.

Format 
Described as "an early version of 60 Minutes", the program featured a magazine-type format with various subjects and guests. The Police Athletic League Chorus was featured on the first episode, and "Walter Law and his stamp collection was an early favorite."

According to some sources, as the series aired during the early days of live television, very few famous people agreed to appear on the series.

Episode status
While it is unclear if any episodes survive of this series, it is certain that none of the 1946 episodes survive, as NBC did not start kinescoping its programs until 1947, and even then only a few series were recorded.

An audio recording of the live TV broadcast of September 14, 1948 from WNBT-TV in New York City is listed as archived in the SONIC Catalogue of Library of Congress. The audio recording features a news recap, followed by interviews with an Irish beauty queen and a horseback rider, among others.

See also
1946-47 United States network television schedule

References

External links
Television Screen Magazine at IMDB

NBC original programming
1946 American television series debuts
1949 American television series endings
1940s American television series
American educational television series
Black-and-white American television shows
English-language television shows